Oskar Schade (25 March 1826 – 30 December 1906) was a German philologist and Germanist born in Erfurt.

In 1860, he received his habilitation at Halle, and from 1863 to 1906 was a professor at the University of Königsberg. 

He was the author of the influential Altdeutsches Wörterbuch (Old German Dictionary), and with August Heinrich Hoffmann von Fallersleben (1798-1874), was co-editor of the Weimarisches Jahrbuch für deutsche Sprache, Literatur und Kunst (Weimar Annals of German language, literature and art). Other noted works by Schade include:
 Geistliche Gedichte des 14. und 15. Jahrhunderts vom Niederrhein (Spiritual poems from the 14th and 15th century of the Lower Rhine), 1854.  
 Satiren und Pasquille aus der Reformationszeit (Pasquille and satire from the time of the Reformation), 1863.
 Deutsche Handwerkslieder, 1865.

References 
 Matthias Janssen: Oskar Schade (1826-1096). In: Jahrbuch der Albertus-Universität Königsberg Bd. XXIX (1994). Hg. von Dietrich Rauschning und Donata v. Nerée. S. 185-202.
 Matthias Janssen: Jacob Grimm und einer seiner Schüler. Der Briefwechsel mit Oskar Schade. In: Brüder Grimm Gedenken 13 (1999), S. 105-120.
 Matthias Janssen: Oskar Schade. In: Internationales Germanistenlexikon 1800-1950. Hrsg. von Christoph König. Berlin 2003. Bd. 3, S. 1574-1576.
  (Biography) 
 Open Library (Publications by author).

German philologists
Academic staff of the University of Königsberg
Writers from Erfurt
1826 births
1906 deaths